Greece has sent six entries to the Junior Eurovision Song Contest, entering at the first contest in 2003.

Greece's first entry was eight-year-old  Nicolas Ganopoulos with the song "Fili gia panta", which came eight for Greece. The country's best entry in the contest is in 2005 when Alexandros and Kalli came sixth for Greece with "Tora einai i seira mas" while their worst result was in 2007, when Made In Greece came 17th and last with only 14 points.

History
Greece opted to be one of the 16 nations to take part in the inaugural edition of the Junior Eurovision Song Contest, and participated in six consecutive contests. 2008 marked their last appearance, with the broadcaster announcing that relatively low television ratings for the contest and an objection to using children played a factor. Hellenic Broadcasting Corporation (ERT) officially decided to not take part in an April 2009 press release citing the economic crisis at the time as an additional factor.

In January 2014, it was reported that NERIT were interested in taking part, taking over from defunct broadcaster ERT. However, it was later confirmed that they would continue their absence from the competition. In June 2020, it was reported that Greek broadcaster ERT were seriously considering returning to the contest in 2020. However, weeks later, it was revealed that the broadcaster had decided not to return to the contest in 2020.

Participation overview

Commentators and spokespersons

The contests are broadcast online worldwide through the official Junior Eurovision Song Contest website junioreurovision.tv and YouTube. In 2015, the online broadcasts featured commentary in English by junioreurovision.tv editor Luke Fisher and 2011 Bulgarian Junior Eurovision Song Contest entrant Ivan Ivanov. The Greek broadcaster, ERT, sent their own commentators to each contest in order to provide commentary in the Greek language. Spokespersons were also chosen by the national broadcaster in order to announce the awarding points from Greece. The table below list the details of each commentator and spokesperson since 2003.

See also
Greece in the Eurovision Song Contest

References

Countries in the Junior Eurovision Song Contest
Junior Eurovision Song Contest